Simon Watson Taylor (15 May 1923 – 4 November 2005) was an English actor and translator, often associated with the Surrealist movement. He was born in Wallingford, Oxfordshire and died in London.

He was secretary for the British Surrealist Group and edited the English language surrealist review Free Unions / Unions Libres but later became a key player in the "science" of Pataphysics. He was educated in England, France, Switzerland, Germany and Austria. Taylor lived in Paris in 1946-7, working for the English section of Radiodiffusion Française.

Taylor's extensive work as a translator of modern and avant-garde French literature and books about art included Surrealism and Painting by André Breton and plays by Boris Vian including The Empire Builders, The Generals' Tea Party and The Knackers' ABC. Others were The Cenci by Antonin Artaud, Paris Peasant by Louis Aragon and numerous works by Alfred Jarry. His collection of Jarry's The Ubu Plays (Methuen, London, 1968) included translations by himself and Cyril Connolly and remains in print.

In 1968 Taylor edited French Writing Today, published in the United Kingdom by Penguin and in 1969 by Grove Press in the United States.

Taylor was an editorial advisor and frequent contributor to the London-based magazine Art and Artists and was the guest co-editor (with Roger Shattuck) of a special issue (May–June 1960) of the American literary magazine Evergreen Review; titled What is Pataphysics?

With Shattuck he also edited The Selected Works of Alfred Jarry (Methuen & Co, London, 1965).

Taylor's papers are in a collection at The University of Tulsa.

External links
 Obituary by George Melly in The Independent (U.K.), 16 November 2005: "Simon Watson Taylor: Surrealist turned anarchist, Pataphysician and hippie"  
 Simon Watson Taylor, Growing up with anarchists, surrealists and pataphysicians (with some comments on Surrealism in Britain by Michael Remy)

1923 births
2005 deaths
20th-century British translators
British surrealist writers
People from Wallingford, Oxfordshire
Translators from French
British expatriates in Germany
British expatriates in France
British expatriates in Switzerland
British expatriates in Austria